Cindy Ann "Cynda" Williams is an American actress.

Early life and education 
Williams was born Cindy Ann Williams in Chicago, Illinois to Charles, a police officer and Beverly, a medical lab technician. She was raised in the Pullman neighborhood on the city's south side. She spent parts of her early childhood in Indiana, where she sang in her grandfather's church. Williams attended Bennett Elementary School before she moved with her mother to Muncie, Indiana, as a teenager. While in Indiana, Williams attended Northside High School; graduating in 1984. After high school, Williams attended Ball State University, studying theater and was crowned Ms. Ball State in 1987. She graduated in 1989.

Career 
In 1989, Williams changed her first name to "Cynda" to avoid conflicts with Laverne & Shirley actress Cindy Williams, who was also listed by the same name with the Screen Actors Guild. Williams has acted in films on both television and in the cinema. Her first appearance in a feature film was in Spike Lee's 1990 Mo' Better Blues. "In the Midwest, I was told by casting directors that I wasn’t the right type because I didn’t look black enough, and I didn’t look white," says Williams. "But everything changed when I moved to New York, because my look could cross different lines." She was also in One False Move (1992) as well as the Tales of the City Channel 4/PBS miniseries. While most well known for her involvement in the movie industry, Williams had a brief stint in the music industry in 1990 with her appearance on the soundtrack to Mo' Better Blues, on the song "Harlem Blues". The single was popular, reaching No. 9 on the R&B charts on November 17, 1990. With the success of the single, Williams had been lined up with Sony to produce her own album. While she was trained in a variety of genres, jazz became pressed on her after the success of "Harlem Blues". The album was shelved following internal disagreements at Sony.

Personal life 
Williams has been married three times and bore one child. Her first marriage was to actor Billy Bob Thornton.

Filmography

Film

Television

Award nominations

References

External links 
 
 Cynda Williams Bio

Living people
African-American actresses
American television actresses
American film actresses
Dunbar Vocational High School alumni
Actresses from Chicago
Actresses from Illinois
Ball State University alumni
21st-century African-American people
21st-century African-American women
20th-century African-American people
20th-century African-American women
Year of birth missing (living people)